Jagpal Singh (born 6 August 1984, in Punjab) is an Indian football player who last played as a defender for East Bengal F.C. in the I-League.

External links
 
 Profile at Goal.com

Indian footballers
1984 births
Living people
Footballers from Hoshiarpur
I-League players
JCT FC players
Salgaocar FC players
East Bengal Club players
India international footballers
Association football defenders